FVP may refer to:

Politics
 Free-minded People's Party (Germany), 1893-1910
 Progressive People's Party (Germany), 1910-1918
 Free People's Party (Germany), 1956-1957

Chemistry
 Flash vacuum pyrolysis